LND may refer to:
 London, Chapman code
 Lingfield College, Lingfield Notre Dame, a primary and secondary school in England
 Lega Nazionale Dilettanti, Italian football association that organizes amateur football leagues including Serie D
 Hunt Field, a small airport in Lander, Wyoming
 Lightning Network Daemon, an implementation of a Lightning Network node
 Longniddry railway station, East Lothian, Scotland, National Rail station code